Estadio Olímpico del IND Managua is a multi-use stadium in Managua, Nicaragua.  It is currently used mostly for football matches, on club level by América Managua, Deportivo Walter Ferretti, Managua F.C. of the Primera División de Nicaragua. The stadium has a capacity of 8,000 spectators.

References

Football venues in Managua
Buildings and structures in Managua